Falmouth High School is a public high school located in the town of Falmouth, Maine in the United States. The school serves roughly 680 students in grades 9–12. Located on the Woodville Road Campus, the current Falmouth High School was completed in 2001, and opened for the 2001–2002 school year. Previously the school was shared with Falmouth Middle School, and from 1930 to 1955 was in the Plummer-Motz building located on the corner of Middle and Lunt Roads. Falmouth High School is located near the geographic center of town, and is abutted by Falmouth's Community park. The school's athletic teams were called the "Yachtsmen" (1950-2021), but the long-lived school mascot was replaced by the "Navigators" (2021-). The school colors are blue and white with gold as secondary.

In November 2008, the citizens of Falmouth rejected a reorganization plan to consolidate with the nearby district of SAD 51, which comprises Cumberland, Maine, and North Yarmouth, Maine. Falmouth has since filed and had approved an alternative reorganization plan allowing it to remain an independent district.

School name & mascot 
In 1948, the name "Yachtsmen" was used in a Portland Press Herald article to unofficially name the FHS students. The name began appearing in yearbooks in 1950 and became the name for the sports teams. The team nickname also had a mascot, Yachtie. Yachtie was an angry, bearded Yachstmen who would occasionally appear at games."Yachtsmen" was the school's name for over 70 years but, the mascot and long-lived name would soon come to an end. In 2021, a survey was sent out to students and staff to find the popularity of the school's name and logo. The survey reflected that 21.5% of students "liked or loved" the nickname and 78.5% disliked or were indifferent to it, some students calling the name "uninclusive". The school board decided that the name would change for the (2021-2022) school year. The school considered many names (ex. Riptide, Kraken, Vikings) but, in the final vote "Navigators" was voted to replace "Yachtsmen". The sports teams are now known as the Falmouth Navigators/NAVS. The school has not announced a replacement for "Yachtie" yet.

Sports 
The Falmouth High School Navigators are currently members of the Southwestern Maine Activities Association (SMAA), in the class A division.

Robotics
Falmouth High School is a member of the Robotics team Northern Force Team 172, along with Gorham High School.

Notable alumni
 Roger Levesque, Major League Soccer player
 John Menario, banker and city administrator

References

External links
"Falmouth Facts" Falmouth Memorial Library website
https://web.archive.org/web/20130510023222/http://sports.mainetoday.com/highschool/tm.html?id=100001
SMAA website and list of champions

Buildings and structures in Falmouth, Maine
Public high schools in Maine
High schools in Cumberland County, Maine